James John Snowden (born January 12, 1942) is a former American football offensive tackle in the National Football League for the Washington Redskins.  He played college football at the University of Notre Dame and was drafted in the fifth round of the 1964 NFL Draft.  Snowden was also selected in the fifteenth round of the 1964 AFL Draft by the Kansas City Chiefs.

1942 births
Living people
Players of American football from Youngstown, Ohio
American football offensive tackles
Notre Dame Fighting Irish football players
Washington Redskins players